Félix Rigau Carrera (August 30, 1894 – October 13, 1954), known as  (The Eagle from Sabana Grande), was the first Puerto Rican pilot and the first Puerto Rican pilot to fly on air mail carrying duties in Puerto Rico.

Early years
Rigau Carrera was one of nine siblings born to Felip Rigau Balbàs, a Spanish Navy sailor from Catalonia, and Carmen Carrera de Rigau, a Puerto Rican homemaker, in the town of Sabana Grande, Puerto Rico. There he received his primary and secondary education. As a child he showed an interest in mechanics and would often model aircraft, using the local cathedral as a launching pad for his small fixed-wing aircraft replicas.

After he graduated from high school, he enrolled at the Colegio de Agricultura y Artes Mecanicas (CAAM) (now the University of Puerto Rico) at Mayagüez and studied electronics and mechanical engineering. During his years at college he continued with his hobby of building and designing airplane models.

After he earned his college degree in mechanical engineering, he joined the United States Army  After serving in the Army, he traveled to Long Island where he finished his flying training

World War I
After he earned his college degree in mechanical engineering, he joined the US Army and was assigned to the Aviation Section, U.S. Signal Corps (the military aviation service of the US Army from 1914 to 1918 and a direct ancestor of the US Air Force). While in the Army, he traveled extensively around the world and became acquainted with many of the world's famous pilots of the era. He became the first Puerto Rican parachutist as a member of the Aviation Section of the US Signal Corps, whose members were among the Army's first parachutist. His stint in the Aviation Section, US Signal Corps inspired him to go and attend various aviation schools upon his release from the military.

Enlisted in the United States Marine Corps upon the outbreak of World War I. After receiving additional aviation training, he was commissioned a second lieutenant and assigned to the First Marine Air Squadron which deployed to France as the newly renamed 1st Marine Aviation Force in July 1918. There Rigau Carrera and his unit provided bomber and fighter support to the Navy's Day Wing, Northern Bombing Group. While serving in First Marine Air Squadron, Rigau Carrera became the first Puerto Rican to pilot a fixed-wing aircraft and the first Hispanic fighter pilot in the Marines.

Historical flights

In July 1919, he went to Texas. Rigau Carrera met Bertha Dunston (1900–1989), who became his wife in 1919 and with whom he was to have three children, Félix (1921–1995), Carmen (1923–2016), and Jaime (1925–1970)  Rigau Carrera returned to Puerto Rico and made it clear to everyone that knew him that his main objective was to be able to someday own his own and fly his own aircraft. Consequently, his four brothers helped him financially to buy his first aircraft, a Curtiss JN-4, $2,250 in 1919. The Curtiss JN-4 "Jenny" was one of a series of "JN" biplanes built by the Curtiss Aeroplane Company of Hammondsport, New York, later the Curtiss Aeroplane and Motor Company. 

Rigau Carrera piloted his first flight in Puerto Rico, flying out of Camp Las Casas, the exact area where Residencial Las Casas is currently located, becoming the first Puerto Rican pilot to do so. At the time, the area was used by the military as an air base and it was also Puerto Rico's first commercial airport, and Rigau Carrera was allowed to perform his historic flight from the air field. Rigau Carrera then started using the air base frequently, for exhibition flights and to carry paying passengers on sightseeing trips. He became a national hero in Puerto Rico during the 1920s, traveling to many Puerto Rican cities by air. The local town people celebrated his landings with live music and fireworks and he became known as "The Eagle of Sabana Grande".

In 1931, Rigau Carrera was given a license by San Juan's mail system authority to deliver mail via air mail throughout the island, becoming the first pilot to fly on air mail carrying duties in Puerto Rico. Rigau Carrera then established a system similar to the one used by the airlines today, where he would fly people from one point of the island to another, with paying customers on board. Not all of his career went without problems, as Rigau Carrera almost lost his life during flights twice, once in San German and another time in Guanica.

Later years

Rigau Carrera  settled in Gloucester, Virginia, in the early 1920s. He lived with his family in an old Abingdon Glebe School House and constructed a building to house a flour mill and other enterprises. Rigau Carrera founded the Rigau Concrete Works which manufactured a wide variety of items to meet the industrial needs of the developing county. Besides concrete blocks, he cast septic tanks, culverts, burial vaults and yard furniture. Rigau Carrera and his wife Bertha, who were certified undertakers, established a funeral home. He amassed a fortune as the owner of the funeral home and concrete factory. While living in Virginia he joined the Virginia Commonwealth USNRF (US Naval Reserve Force) 

When the United States entered World War II, Rigau Carrera joined the United States Merchant Marine and where he served throughout the war years. During these years, Félix and Bertha divorced. He met and married Estella Martins from the Azores of Portugal with whom he had three more children, Félix, Philip, and Maria.

Rigau Carrera died at the age of 60 and was buried with full military honors at Abingdon Episcopal Church Cemetery. His native hometown, Sabana Grande, named a street Calle Félix Rigau Carrera in his honor. On September 14, 2011, he was honored posthumously during the Hispanic Heritage Awards at Cleveland International Airport in Cleveland, Ohio.

The American Legion Post 36 in Sabana Grande, Puerto Rico, was named in honor of LTJG Félix Rigau Carrera.

Military awards

See also

List of Puerto Ricans

Notes

References

1894 births
1954 deaths
People from Sabana Grande, Puerto Rico
Puerto Rican Army personnel
Puerto Rican aviators
20th-century Puerto Rican businesspeople
Puerto Rican United States Marines
Recipients of the Croix de Guerre (France)
United States Merchant Mariners
United States Army soldiers
United States Marines
United States Marine Corps personnel of World War I
United States Marine Corps officers
United States Naval Aviators
People from Gloucester Courthouse, Virginia